Love is a 1991 Soviet romance film directed by Valery Todorovsky.

Plot 
A student meets a girl at a party. They understand each other and decide to get married. But the problem is that they are too different.

Cast 
 Yevgeny Mironov as Sasha
 Natalya Petrova as Mariya
 Dmitry Maryanov as Vadim
 Tatyana Skorokhodova as Marina
 Natalya Vilkina
 Inna Slobodskaya
 Vija Artmane
 Lev Durov
 Anatoli Popolzukhin
 Raisa Ryazanova

References

External links 
 

1991 films
1990s Russian-language films
Soviet romance films
Films directed by Valery Todorovsky
1991 romance films